Regional elections were held in some regions of Italy during 1983. These included:

Aosta Valley on 26 June
Friuli-Venezia Giulia on 26 June
Trentino-Alto Adige on 20 November

Elections in Italian regions
1983 elections in Italy